Regina Daniels (born October 10, 2000) is a Nigerian actress and a film producer. she is a business woman and a Serial Entrepreneur.

Personal life and education 
Regina Daniels is a Nollywood film actress and a model. She was born in Lagos, Nigeria, on October 10, 2000. Her mother is Rita Daniel who is also an actress/film producer and the chairman of the Actors Guild of Nigeria (AGN) in Delta State, Nigeria.  Regina grew up in Asaba, Delta State of Nigeria. She has five siblings - three brothers and two sisters. She is the second youngest child in her family. One of her role models growing up was Academy award-winning actress Angelina Jolie. She attended Hollywood International School and in 2018, Regina Daniels proceeded to study Mass Communication at Igbinedion University.

Career
Regina Daniels started movie making at the age of seven; her mother (Rita Daniels) is an actress. She got support from her mother and her siblings. Her first movie was Marriage of Sorrow which earned her 10,000 Nigerian Naira. Regina featured in a Nollywood movie titled "Miracle Child" in 2010. Regina Daniels has been featured in a comedy skit by Ofego on two occasions on his YouTube channel using archive footage.

In January 2019, Regina Daniels was appointed Atiku Abubakar’s Youth Campaign Coordinator. In February 2020, Regina Daniels launched a magazine named after her at a hotel in Abuja.

Filmography

Controversy

Cyber crime/fraud allegation 
A plot to implicate Daniels in a scam involving alleged intimate photos of an aspiring actress started on 20 November 2017. A person claimed that she had sent photos to Daniels, and was then asked to meet with a movie producer who would train her on being a better actress. After the meeting Regina Daniels was said to have been angry with the victim inciting that the aspiring actress should have offered herself to the producer. Two days later Daniels denied all allegations, and said a fan was using her name to dupe the actress. On 23 November 2017, the impersonator was arrested by the police and Regina Daniels was exonerated.

Marriage to Ned Nwoko 
On April 1, 2019, e-Nigeria! a news website made a publication stating that Ned Nwoko was the financial sponsor of Regina Daniels. The publication went viral and was cited by many news websites in Nigeria and Kemi Filani News. Etinosa Idemudia in response to media critics responded on her social media handle that it is an honor that Regina Daniels was made the 6th wife of the senator elect instead of a "side chic". On 27 April 2019, Ned Nwoko obtained an honorary doctorate degree from Federal University of Petroleum Resources Effurun where Harrysong was the anchor of the event when both Regina Daniels and Ned Nwoko were spotted dancing together.

She has been widely criticized by fans and Nigerians on her alleged marriage to the 59-year-old.

On 29 June 2020, she gave birth to a baby boy for Nwoko, two years later (29 June 2022) she welcomed her second child with him.

Awards and nominations

See also
 List of Nigerian film producers

References

External links

21st-century Nigerian actresses
Actresses from Delta State
Living people
2000 births
Nigerian film actresses
Nigerian film producers
Igbinedion University alumni
Nigerian female adult models
Nigerian businesspeople
Nigerian female models